Howard Augustine Ozmon, Jr. (born 1929) was a professor emeritus of Virginia Commonwealth University.

He lived in Portsmouth, Virginia, and received an A.A. degree from St. Bernard College in Alabama, a B.A. from the University of Virginia Alumni 1954  in Philosophy, a Master of Arts in International and Comparative Education, and an Ed.D. in Philosophy of Education from Teachers College, Columbia University.  He taught in the public schools of New York and New Jersey, and at several colleges and universities, including the University of Virginia and Virginia Commonwealth University.  He was also professor and chairman of the Department of Education at Chicago State University.

Dr. Ozmon is the author of many books and articles dealing with philosophy and education, including the eighth edition of Philosophical Foundations of Education  re-published by Merrill Prentice-Hall (2008 & 2012). He is also a writer of novels, short stories, plays, and books for children including the following:

Challenging Ideas in Education
Dialogue in the Philosophy of Education (The Coordinated Teacher Preparation Series)
Utopias and Education, Tall Enterprises, 1980
Twelve Great Philosophers (The Wonderful World of Children's Books)
Contemporary Critics of Education
Challenging Ideas in Education

Howard lived in Hollywood, Floridaat the time of his death.

References 

Philosophers of education
1929 births
Living people
American philosophers
Teachers College, Columbia University alumni
Virginia Commonwealth University faculty
University of Virginia alumni
People from Portsmouth, Virginia